The Luby's shooting was a mass shooting that took place on October 16, 1991, at a Luby's Cafeteria in Killeen, Texas. The perpetrator, George Hennard, drove his pickup truck through the front window of the restaurant. He shot and killed 23 people, and wounded 27 others. He had a brief shootout with police, was seriously wounded but refused their orders to surrender. He then fatally shot himself.

At the time, the shooting was the deadliest mass shooting by a lone gunman in U.S. history, being surpassed 16 years later by the Virginia Tech shooting.

Incident
On October 16, 1991, 35-year-old George Hennard, an unemployed former merchant seaman, drove a blue 1987 Ford Ranger pickup truck through the plate-glass front window of a Luby's Cafeteria in Killeen, Texas, at 12:39 p.m. October 16 was Boss's Day, and the cafeteria was unusually crowded with around 150 people. Hennard then began firing from inside the truck while holding Glock 17 and Ruger P89 pistols; the first victim was veterinarian Michael Griffith. Hennard exited the truck and yelled, "All women of Killeen and Belton are vipers! This is what you've done to me and my family! This is what Bell County did to me ... this is payback day!" He then opened fire on the patrons and staff with both pistols. Hennard then circled around the cafeteria, selectively picking his victims. Hennard said "You bitch" to a woman before fatally shooting her.

Hennard saw another woman hiding underneath a bench near the serving line and said "Hiding from me, bitch?" before shooting her dead. Hennard then approached Steve Ernst who was hiding underneath a table before shooting him. Ernst then rolled over, holding his stomach.  The shooter then approached a woman with a crying baby. He barked at the woman, saying, "You with the baby. Get out before I change my mind." The woman ran out, holding the baby in her arms. After the woman left, Hennard shot Ernst's wife in the arm which went clean through and instead killed 70-year-old Venice Ellen Henehan, Ernst's mother-in-law. During a brief lull in the shooting, Hennard approached the table of 28-year-old Tommy Vaughan in the rear of the cafeteria. 

Huddled on the floor beside a window, Vaughn threw himself through the window, creating an escape route for others. Dozens of people pushed, shoved, and knocked each other down as they made their escape. When police arrived a few minutes later, a third of the victims had managed to escape.

Hennard reloaded at least three times before police arrived and engaged in a brief shootout. Wounded, he retreated to an area between the two bathrooms (people were hiding in these bathrooms and had blocked their doors). Police repeatedly ordered Hennard to surrender, but he refused, saying, "No, I'm going to kill more people." Hennard was shot twice more by police, in the abdomen. Having depleted ammunition for one of his weapons and his injuries growing more severe, he shot himself in the head with the final bullet. He had shot and killed 23 people — 10 of them with single shots to the head at point blank range — and wounded another 27.

Deaths
Victims of the rampage who died were:

Perpetrator

George Pierre Hennard was born on October 15, 1956, in Sayre, Pennsylvania, in a wealthy family. Hennard was the son of a Swiss-born surgeon and a homemaker. He had two younger siblings, brother Alan and sister Desiree. Since the age of 5, Hennard and his family moved across the country as his father worked at several army hospitals. Hennard's family later moved to New Mexico, where his father worked at the White Sands Missile Range near Las Cruces. After graduating from Mayfield High School in 1974, he enlisted in the U.S. Navy and served for three years, until he was honorably discharged. Hennard later worked as a merchant mariner, but was dismissed for drug use. Several months later, Hennard enrolled in a drug treatment program in Houston.

Early in the investigation of the massacre, the Killeen police chief said that Hennard "had an evident problem with women for some reason". After his parents divorced in 1983, his father moved to Houston, and his mother moved to Henderson, Nevada. The Glock 17 and Ruger P89 9mm pistols which Hennard used were purchased in February 1991 at Mike's Gun House, a gun shop in Henderson, Nevada.

Hennard had begun to work at several different jobs, including construction crews in South Dakota and Killeen while living part-time in
Nevada with his mother. In Texas, he lived in a redbrick colonial home in Belton which his family had purchased in 1980 shortly after moving to Fort Hood.

Hennard had stalked two sisters, 23-year-old Jill Fritz and 19-year-old Jana Jemigan who lived two blocks away from him in his neighborhood. He sent them a five-page letter in June, part of which said: "Please give me the satisfaction of some day laughing in the face of all those mostly white treacherous female vipers from those two towns [Killeen and Belton] who tried to destroy me and my family" and “You think the three of us can get together some day?” He also wrote that he was "truly flattered knowing I have two teenage groupie fans".

Possible motive
Hennard was described as reclusive and belligerent, with an explosive temper. He was discharged from the Merchant Marine on May 11, 1989 for possession of marijuana and racial incidents. That same month, Hennard's seaman papers were suspended after he had a racial argument with another shipmate. Numerous reports included accounts of Hennard's expressed hatred of women. An ex-roommate of his said, "He hated blacks, Hispanics, and gays. He said women were snakes and always had derogatory remarks about them, especially after fights with his mother." Survivors of the shootings later said Hennard had passed over men to shoot women. Fifteen of the 23 murder victims were women, as were many of the wounded. He called two of the victims a "bitch" before shooting them. 

In 1990, Hennard called Isaiah (Ike) R. Williams, a port agent for the national maritime union in Wilmington, California, stating that he needed a letter of recommendation in order to regain his papers and rejoin the Merchant Marine. "I don't recall having given him one", Williams claimed. Hennard had learned in mid-February that his attempt to be reinstated had been denied. Several months later, he entered a drug treatment program in Houston. 

Around two months before the shooting, Hennard entered a convenience store in Belton to buy breakfast. Mead, the clerk of the store, claimed that Hennard had leaned over the counter and said, "I want you to tell everybody, if they don't quit messing around my house something awful is going to happen."

A week and a half before the shooting, Hennard collected his paycheck at a cement company in Copperas Cove and announced he was quitting. Hennard also wondered aloud what would happen if he killed someone. "He got to talking about some of the people in Belton and certain women that had given him problems", a coworker Bubba Hawkins claimed. "And he kept saying, 'Watch and see, watch and see'."

On his 35th birthday, October 15, 1991, Hennard spoke with his mother on the phone. Later that evening, while eating a cheeseburger and french fries outside of Belton, Hennard had a sudden outburst of rage as he watched television coverage of Clarence Thomas's confirmation hearings. "When an interview with Anita Hill came on, he just went off", Bill Stringer, a manager, said. "He started screaming, 'You dumb bitch! You bastards opened the door for all the women!'"

Aftermath

An anti-crime bill was scheduled for a vote in the U.S. House of Representatives the day after the massacre. Some of the Hennard victims had been constituents of Rep. Chet Edwards, and in response he abandoned his opposition to a gun control provision that was part of the bill. The provision, which did not pass, would have banned some weapons and magazines like one used by Hennard.

Families of deceased victims, survivors, and policemen received counseling for grief, shock and stress.

The Texas State Rifle Association and others preferred that the state allow its citizens to carry concealed weapons. Democratic governor Ann Richards vetoed such bills, but in 1995 her Republican successor, George W. Bush, signed one into force. The law had been campaigned for by Suzanna Hupp, who was present at the massacre; both of her parents, Alphonse "Al" Gratia and Ursula "Suzy" Gratia, were killed by Hennard. She later testified that she would have liked to have had her .38 revolver, but said, "It was a hundred feet away in my car." (She had feared that if she was caught carrying it she might lose her chiropractor's license.) Hupp testified across the country in support of concealed handgun laws, and was elected to the Texas House of Representatives in 1996.

A pink granite memorial stands behind the Killeen Community Center with the date of the event and the names of those killed.

Present site
The restaurant reopened five months after the massacre, but closed permanently on September 9, 2000. In 2006, a buffet called "Yank Sing" occupied the former Luby's. The restaurant remains open as of June 2022.

See also

 Gun violence in the United States
 Mass shootings in the United States
 2009 Fort Hood shooting and 2014 Fort Hood shootings, two other mass shootings in Killeen, Texas
 San Ysidro McDonald's massacre, the deadliest mass shooting in the United States prior to the Luby's shooting.
 List of shootings in Texas

References

Further reading

1991 in Texas
1991 mass shootings in the United States
1991 murders in the United States
1990s crimes in Texas
20th-century mass murder in the United States
Attacks in the United States in 1991
Attacks on buildings and structures in 1991
Attacks on buildings and structures in the United States
Attacks on restaurants in North America
Bell County, Texas
Deaths by firearm in Texas
Killeen–Temple–Fort Hood metropolitan area
Mass murder in 1991
Mass murder in Texas
Mass murder in the United States
Mass shootings in Texas
Mass shootings in the United States
Massacres in the United States
Massacres of women
Murder–suicides in Texas
October 1991 crimes
October 1991 events in the United States
1991 suicides
Vehicular rampage in the United States
Violence against women in the United States